Milton Subotsky (September 27, 1921 – June 27, 1991) was an American film and television writer and producer. In 1964, he founded Amicus Productions with Max J. Rosenberg. Amicus means "friend" in Latin. The partnership produced low-budget science fiction and horror films in the United Kingdom.

Early life and career
Subotsky was born in New York City, to a family of Jewish immigrants. During World War II, he served in the Signal Corps, in which he wrote and edited technical training films. After the war, he began a career as a writer and producer during the 1950s "Golden Age" of television, including the television series The Clock and Lights Out. 

In 1954, he wrote and produced the TV series Junior Science. He graduated to film producing Rock, Rock, Rock (1956), for which he also composed nine songs. Subotsky moved to England; he produced his first horror film, The City of the Dead (aka, Horror Hotel, 1960), at Shepperton Studios. He was a regular juror on Juke Box Jury on BBC Television in the early 1960s.

Amicus Productions

In 1964, with fellow expatriate producer Max J. Rosenberg, Subotsky formed the company Amicus Productions. Based at Shepperton Studios, they produced such films as Dr. Terror's House of Horrors (1964), Dr. Who and the Daleks (1965), Daleks' Invasion Earth 2150 A.D. (1966), Torture Garden (1967), Scream and Scream Again (1970), The House That Dripped Blood (1970), Tales from The Crypt (1972), Asylum (1972), From Beyond the Grave (1973) and The Land That Time Forgot (1975).

Sword & Sorcery Productions
Amicus was disestablished in 1975, but Subotsky continued producing. Around this time he formed Sword & Sorcery Productions, Ltd., with Frank Duggan. At some point Andrew Donally joined the company. Numerous projects did not enter production. These include adaptations of Lin Carter's "Thongor" stories, a live-action version of Stan Lee's The Incredible Hulk, film adaptations of stories that appeared in James Warren's comic magazines Creepy and Eerie, and a co-production with former James Bond film producer Harry Saltzman on Saltzman's troubled "shrunken man" epic The Micronauts.

Unable to purchase film rights to Robert E. Howard's Conan the Barbarian stories, Subotsky instead bought the rights to Carter's "Thongor" stories in 1976. Subotsky himself adapted Carter's 1965 novel The Wizard of Lemuria. United Artists agreed to bankroll the project – now called Thongor in the Valley of Demons – in 1978, but subsequently withdrew for unspecified reasons.

Sword & Sorcery's first film project to get off the ground was Dominique. In 1980, they co-produced the TV series The Martian Chronicles, adapted from the short story collection by Ray Bradbury. During the making of this miniseries, Subotsky and Donally parted ways.

Later career and death
Subotsky also co-produced several adaptations of Stephen King novels, including Cat's Eye (1985), Maximum Overdrive (1986), Sometimes They Come Back (a 1991 TV film) and The Lawnmower Man (1992). The Director's Cut of the latter was dedicated to his memory.

Subotsky died of heart disease in 1991, at the age of 69. His widow, Dr Fiona Subotsky, is a prominent London psychiatrist, and an historian of psychiatry.

Filmography
Close (Series) 1954
Junior Science (Series) 1956
Rock Rock Rock! 1957
Jamboree! 1959
City of the Dead 1960
The Last Mile 1960
It's Trad, Dad! 1962
Ring A Ding Rhythm 1963
Just for Fun 1963
Dr. Terror's House of Horrors 1965
Dr. Who and the Daleks 1965
The Skull 1965
The World of Abbott and Costello 1965
The Psychopath 1966
The Deadly Bees 1966
Daleks' Invasion Earth 2150 A.D. 1966
The Terrornauts 1967
They Came from Beyond Space 1967
Torture Garden 1967
Danger Route 1967
The Birthday Party 1968
A Touch of Love 1969
Scream and Scream Again 1970
The Mind of Mr. Soames 1970
The House That Dripped Blood 1971
I, Monster 1971
Tales from the Crypt 1972
What Became of Jack and Jill? 1972
Asylum 1972
The Vault of Horror 1973
And Now the Screaming Starts! 1973
From Beyond the Grave 1974
The Beast Must Die 1974
Madhouse 1974
The Land That Time Forgot 1974
At the Earth's Core 1976
The People That Time Forgot 1977
The Uncanny 1977
Dominique 1979
The Martian Chronicles 1981 Mini Series
Cat's Eye 1985
Maximum Overdrive 1986
Sometimes They Come Back 1991
The Lawnmower Man 1992
Sometimes They Come Back... Again 1996

References

External links

1921 births
1991 deaths
20th-century American businesspeople
American company founders
American expatriates in the United Kingdom
Film producers from New York (state)
American film score composers
American male film score composers
Jewish American military personnel
United States Army personnel of World War II
American male screenwriters
American television writers
Businesspeople from New York City
Jewish American songwriters
Jewish American writers
Television producers from New York City
Place of death missing
20th-century classical musicians
American male television writers
20th-century American composers
Screenwriters from New York (state)
20th-century American male musicians
American film editors
20th-century American male writers
20th-century American screenwriters
20th-century American Jews